Flagstaff Mountain is a large mountain located southwest of Northport, Washington. Flagstaff Mountain is composed  of Paleozoic sedimentary and intrusive igneous rocks that have been complexly metamorphosed, faulted, and eroded to reveal the rugged landform observed today. The Hubbard and Flagstaff Mountain Barite mines near the summit represent some of the rich mining history in this region geologists refer to as the Kootenay Arc.

External links
Topographical map

References

:Category:Mountains of Stevens County, Washington
:Category:Landforms of Stevens County, Washington

Stevens County, Washington
Mountains of Washington (state)